Ronald E. Foxx (born May 2, 1951) is a Canadian football player who played professionally for the Montreal Alouettes, Ottawa Rough Riders and Toronto Argonauts. He began his career playing with the Birmingham Americans of the World Football League (WFL) and signed with Toronto in 1976. He won East All-Stars (1979 and 1980) and one CFL All-Star (1979).

References

1951 births
Living people
Toronto Argonauts players